Robert Edward Blaylock (born June 28, 1935) is an American former professional baseball player, a right-handed pitcher who played parts of two Major League Baseball seasons for the 1956 and 1959 St. Louis Cardinals.

Blaylock spent his entire, ten-year professional career in the Cardinal organization after signing with the club following his Muldrow, Oklahoma, high school graduation. A hard thrower who led the 1958 American Association in strikeouts, Blaylock lost two fingers on his left (non-pitching) hand after a farm accident in his youth.

His first trial with the Cardinals came in  after a hot start (nine wins, four losses and an earned run average of 1.67) with the Rochester Red Wings of the International League. On July 22, he made his Major League debut as a starting pitcher against the Brooklyn Dodgers at Busch Stadium; he pitched five shutout innings against the defending world champions, but tired thereafter and surrendered five runs (including home runs by Rube Walker and Duke Snider) in 7⅔ innings in a 5–3 defeat. Wildness plagued Blaylock in his next start four days later against the Philadelphia Phillies, as he issued seven bases on balls in four innings pitched and was lifted with none out in the fifth frame. All told, Blaylock appeared in 14 games and 41 innings as a rookie; while he struck out 39 batters, he walked 24 and gave up 45 hits. He dropped six of his seven decisions, with an earned run average of 6.37.

Blaylock spent the next three seasons in minor league baseball before he was recalled in September . Blaylock appeared in three games, all against the Chicago Cubs, one as a starter. He was more effective than in 1956, but lost his only decision. As a Major Leaguer, he appeared in 17 games and 50 innings, and yielded 53 hits and 27 bases on balls, with 42 strikeouts. His minor league career ended after the 1962 season, his fourth consecutive season with the Redbirds' Double-A Tulsa Oilers affiliate in Blaylock's home state of Oklahoma.

Bob Blaylock was one of three men with the same surname who played in the National League during the 1950s.  Marv was a first baseman, mostly for the Phillies, who walked twice and grounded out against Bob Blaylock in his July 26, 1956, start. Gary Blaylock was also a right-handed pitcher for the Cardinals and an occasional teammate of Bob's. The Blaylocks were not related.

References

External links

Venezuelan Professional Baseball League statistics

1935 births
Ardmore Cardinals players
Baseball players from Oklahoma
Columbus Cardinals players
Fresno Cardinals players
Leones del Caracas players
Venezuelan Professional Baseball League players by team
Living people
Major League Baseball pitchers
Omaha Cardinals players
People from Chattanooga, Tennessee
People from Muldrow, Oklahoma
Sportspeople from Tulsa, Oklahoma
Rochester Red Wings players
St. Louis Cardinals players
Tulsa Oilers (baseball) players